Calaveras Big Trees State Park is a state park of California, United States, preserving two groves of giant sequoia trees.  It is located 4 miles (6.4 km) northeast of Arnold, California in the middle elevations of the Sierra Nevada.  It has been a major tourist attraction since 1852, when the existence of the trees was first widely reported, and is considered the longest continuously operated tourist facility in California.

History

Early History

The giant sequoia was well known to Native American tribes living in its area. Native American names for the species include Wawona, toos-pung-ish and hea-mi-within, the latter two in the language of the Tule River Tribe.

The first reference to the giant sequoias of Calaveras Big Trees by Europeans is in 1833, in the diary of the explorer J. K. Leonard; the reference does not mention any specific locality, but his route would have taken him through the Calaveras Grove. This discovery was not publicized. The next European to see the trees was John M. Wooster, who carved his initials in the bark of the 'Hercules' tree in the Calaveras Grove in 1850; again, this received no publicity. Much more publicity was given to the "discovery" by Augustus T. Dowd of the North Grove in 1852, and this is commonly cited as the discovery of both the grove and the species as a whole.

The "Discovery Tree" was noted by Augustus T. Dowd in 1852 and felled in 1853, leaving a giant stump and a section of trunk showing the holes made by the augers used to fell it. It measured  in diameter at its base and was determined by ring count to be 1,244 years old when felled. A section of the trunk was toured with little fanfare while the stump was later turned into a dance floor. John Muir wrote an essay titled "The Vandals Then Danced Upon the Stump!" to criticize the felling of the tree.

In 1854, a second tree named the "Mother of the Forest" was skinned alive, of its bark in 1854, to be reassembled at exhibitions. This mortally wounded the tree, since outer layer of protective bark was taken away, tree lost its resistance to fire. If you look closely there are still horizontal saw marks in the wood to remove the bark.
The tree didn't survive long after, having shed its entire canopy by 1861. In 1908, with the tree unprotected by its fire resistant bark, a fire swept through the area and burned away much of what was left of the tree. Today, only a fire-blackened snag remains of the Mother of the Forest.

In early 1880s, a tunnel was cut through the compartments by a private land owner at the request of James Sperry, founder of the Murphys Hotel, so that tourists could pass through it.
The tree was chosen in part because of the large forest fire scar. The Pioneer Cabin Tree, as it was soon called, emulated the tunnel carved into Yosemite's Wawona Tree, and was intended to compete with it for tourists.

Calls for preservation
Despite or due to the 1850s exhibitions, the destruction of the big trees was met with public outcry. In 1864, on introducing the bill that would become the Yosemite Grant, senator John Conness opined that even after people had seen the physical evidence of the Discovery Tree and the Mother of the Forest, they still did not believe the trees were genuine, and that the areas they were from should be protected instead. However, this did not guarantee any legal protection for the trees of Calaveras Grove.

Establishing Calaveras Big Trees State Park
By the turn of the century the land was owned by several lumber companies, with plans to cut the remaining trees down, as sequoia and giant sequoia with their thick trunks were seen as great sources of lumber at the time. This again caused a chorus of public outcry by locals and conservationists, and the area continued to be treated as a tourist attraction. The Yosemite protection was gradually extended to most sequoias, and Calaveras Grove was joined to California State Parks in 1931.

Parcels of land that would later become the state park and nearby national park were optioned by lumberman Robert P. Whiteside in January 1900, with the intention of logging. A protracted battle to preserve the trees was launched by Laura Lyon White and the California Club. Despite legislation in 1900 and 1909 authorizing the federal government to purchase the property, Whiteside refused to sell the land at the offered price, preferring its higher valuation as parkland.  It was not until 1931 that Whiteside's family began to divest the property, beginning with the North Grove.

The area was declared a state park in 1931 and now encompasses  in Calaveras and Tuolumne counties.

The North Grove contains about 100 mature giant sequoias; the South Grove, about 1,000. According to Naturalist John Muir the forest protected by the park is: "A flowering glade in the very heart of the woods, forming a fine center for the student, and a delicious resting place for the weary."

Attractions

The North Grove includes several noteworthy giant sequoias:
Discovery Tree: the stump of what was once the largest tree of the park.
Mother of the Forest: a fire-blackened snag is all that remains of the second largest tree of the park.
Pioneer Cabin Tree: a giant sequoia tree that collapsed during a storm on January 8, 2017; it was one of only two living giant sequoia tunnel trees still standing (the other being the California Tunnel Tree of Mariposa Grove).

The South Grove also included several noteworthy giant sequoias:
It is the 37th largest giant sequoia in the world, and could be considered either the 36th or 35th largest depending on how badly Ishi Giant and Black Mountain Beauty have atrophied following devastating wildfires in 2015 and 2017, respectively.

Palace Hotel Tree: the second largest living tree of the Calaveras groves; features a large deep burn scar at its base that one can walk into. This tree has nails burned into its inner trunk by past travelers.

Other attractions of Calaveras Big Trees include the Stanislaus River, Beaver Creek, the Lava Bluff Trail, and Bradley Trail.

Activities
The park houses two main campgrounds with a total of 129 campsites, six picnic areas and hundreds of miles of established trails.

Other activities include cross-country skiing, evening ranger talks, numerous interpretive programs, environmental educational programs, junior ranger programs, hiking, mountain biking, bird watching and summer school activities for school children. Dogs are welcome in the park on leash in developed areas like picnic sites, campgrounds, roads and fire roads (dirt). Dogs are not allowed on the designated trails, nor in the woods in general.

Public access

The park is open year-round. The main road through the park is closed during the winter season. The North Grove Area is easily accessible during the winter season.

Public transportation

There are no public transportation options to the park at this time. The closest bus stop is the Arnold Public Library in Arnold, California.

Accessing the park via Gate 15

The park is accessible via Upper Moran road at gate 15. There is no public parking. Consider this access option if entering the park on foot, bicycle, snowshoe or cross-country ski.

See also 
 Calaveras Big Tree National Forest
 Chandelier Tree - another tunnel tree, but a coast redwood not a giant sequoia
 List of giant sequoia groves
 List of California state parks

References

Notes

Citations

External links

 Calaveras Big Trees State Park
 Calaveras Big Trees Association
 

State parks of California
Campgrounds in California
Forests of California
Giant sequoia groves
Parks in Calaveras County, California
Protected areas established in 1931
Protected areas of the Sierra Nevada (United States)
1931 establishments in California
History of Calaveras County, California